Dipodium, commonly known as hyacinth orchids, is a genus of about forty species of orchids native to tropical, subtropical and temperate regions of south-east Asia, New Guinea, the Pacific Islands and Australia. It includes both terrestrial and climbing species, some with leaves and some leafless, but all with large, often colourful flowers on tall flowering stems. It is the only genus of its alliance, Dipodium.

Description
Orchids in the genus Dipodium are perennial, terrestrial herbs or climbers/epiphytes. Many species, particularly in eastern Australia are leafless mycoheterotrophs. Others have medium-sized to very large leaves that are parallel-veined and have entire margins. The flowers are arranged in a raceme with very few or up to fifty large, often colourful flowers. These may be fragrant or odourless, are white, pink, purple, yellow or green, often with spots or blotches. The sepals and petals are free from and similar to each other. The labellum projects forwards and has three lobes with a central band of colourful hairs. Each flower has two pollinia that are supported on two stipes. Dehiscent capsules, produced after flowering, hold the seed which is released when the capsule splits longitudinally along six seams. Between 30 and 500 seeds are produced per capsule.

Taxonomy
The genus was formally described in 1810 by Scottish botanist Robert Brown in Prodromus Florae Novae Hollandiae et Insulae Van Diemen. The name Dipodium is derived the Greek words di (two) and podia (little feet), a reference to the two stipes supporting the pollinia.

Distribution and habitat
Hyacinth orchids are found in Malaysia, the Philippines, Indonesia, the Solomon Islands, the New Hebrides, New Caledonia, New Guinea and Australia where eleven species are endemic. They occur in a range of habitats from coastal lowlands to ranges and tablelands.

Ecology
It is thought that the flowers attract native bees and wasps through floral mimicry.

Uses
An infusion of the leaves of Dipodium pandanum is traditionally drunk in Bouganville to help relieve respiratory infections.

Use in horticulture
Leafless hyacinth orchids are impossible to grow in cultivation but D. pandanum is easy to grow in warm climates.

Species
The following is a list of described species in the genus Dipodium, recognised by the World Checklist of Selected Plant Families apart from Dipodium punctatum which is recognised as a species in Australia (rather than as a synonym of Dipodium squamatum).

Dipodium ambiguum - from Malesia
Dipodium atropurpureum - purple hyacinth orchid, from New South Wales
Dipodium bicallosum - from Peninsular Malaysia and Sumatra
Dipodium bicarinatum - from Peninsular Malaysia
Dipodium brassii - from Papua New Guinea
Dipodium brevilabium - from Western Papua 
Dipodium campanulatum - bell-flower hyacinth-orchid, from South Australia and Victoria
Dipodium chanii - from Borneo
Dipodium conduplicatum - from Peninsular Malaysia and Sumatra
Dipodium confusum - from Borneo
Dipodium elatum – from Sumatra
Dipodium elegans - from Sumatra
Dipodium elegantulum - elegant hyacinth-orchid, from Queensland
Dipodium ensifolium - leafy hyacinth-orchid, from north-east Queensland
Dipodium fevrellii - from Sulawesi 
Dipodium fragrans - from Sumatra, Peninsular Malaysia, Borneo and Sulawesi
Dipodium freycinetioides - from Palau 
Dipodium gracile - from Sulawesi
Dipodium hamiltonianum - yellow hyacinth-orchid, from Queensland, New South Wales, the A.C.T. and Victoria
Dipodium javanicum - from West Java
Dipodium lambii - from Borneo
Dipodium meijeri - from Borneo
Dipodium moultonii - from Borneo
Dipodium paludosum - from Cambodia, Thailand, Vietnam, The Philippines, Sumatra, Peninsular Malaysia and Borneo
Dipodium pandanum – Maluku to Papuasia and Queensland
Dipodium pardalinum - spotted hyacinth-orchid or leopard hyacinth-orchid, from South Australia and Victoria
Dipodium parviflorum - from Peninsular Malaysia and Sumatra
Dipodium pictum - from Malesia and the Cape York Peninsula in Queensland
Dipodium pulchellum - from New South Wales and Queensland
Dipodium punctatum - blotched hyacinth-orchid or hyacinth orchid, from New South Wales, the A.C.T., Victoria, and South Australia
Dipodium purpureum - from Borneo
Dipodium robertyongii - from Borneo
Dipodium roseum -  rosy hyacinth-orchid or pink hyacinth-orchid, from Queensland, New South Wales, the A.C.T., Victoria, South Australia and Tasmania
Dipodium scandens - from Borneo, Java, The Philippines, Sulawesi, New Guinea, the Bismark Archipelago and the Solomon Islands
Dipodium speciosum - from Peninsular Malaysia
Dipodium squamatum - from New Caledonia and Vanuatu
Dipodium stenocheilum - tropical hyacinth-orchid, from the northern parts of Western Australia, the Northern Territory and Queensland.
Dipodium variegatum - blotched hyacinth-orchid or slender hyacinth-orchid, from Queensland, New South Wales and Victoria
Dipodium wenzelii - from Borneo

Undescribed species
Dipodium sp. Basalt Woodland (M.D. Barrett 198) - northern Kimberley, Western Australia.
Dipodium sp. Sandstone (R.L. Barrett & K.W. Dixon 1642)  - northern Kimberley,

References

External links

 
Eulophiinae genera